The 2006 Dunlop MSA British Touring Car Championship season was the 49th British Touring Car Championship (BTCC) season. As in 2005, there were ten racing weekends at nine different circuits; each round comprising three races, making a thirty round competition in total.

Changes for 2006

Teams and drivers
The Triple 8-run works Vauxhall effort continued with a trio of entries in their second season with the Astra Sport Hatch.  Yvan Muller left the team after six seasons to contest the World Touring Car Championship for SEAT, and was replaced by Italian veteran Fabrizio Giovanardi, a multiple champion in several European series but contesting his first season in British touring cars.  Tom Chilton replaced Colin Turkington in the second car after three seasons with the Arena Motorsport-run Honda programme, while Gavin Smith spent a second season in the third car.  Turkish touring car champion Erkut Kizilirmak also appeared at two rounds in a fourth entry.

Vauxhall's only opposition for a sixth straight Manufacturers title came from SEAT, who replaced its trio of Toledos with a pair of new Leons.  Jason Plato again headed their assault, while the second seat was alternated throughout the year between the returning James Thompson (also racing for SEAT in the WTCC) and sportscar star Darren Turner.  Both drivers ran at the final meeting with Thompson using his WTCC car.

Reigning Teams and Independents champions Team Dynamics ran their pair of self-developed Honda Integra Type Rs for a second year, with champion Matt Neal remaining with his family team. Scottish driver Gordon Shedden graduated from the SEAT Cupra championship to replace Dan Eaves, while Gareth Howell again appeared in a third car later in the season as he had in 2005.

In its third year as an independent, West Surrey Racing continued to run its ex-works MG ZSs, in spite of (MG Rover in fact having gone out of business during 2005. Colin Turkington returned to the team after a disappointing year at Vauxhall, partnering Rob Collard, who had been the team's sole driver in 2005.

Among the most competitive newcomers to the series were two teams making the transition from GT racing with Team Dynamics' 2005 title-winning Integras.  Team Eurotech ran team boss Mike Jordan, the most experienced driver on the grid, back in the BTCC after well over a decade away in sportscar and GT racing. Motorbase Performance ran David Pinkney, another returning veteran, who was making his first BTCC appearance since 2001.  Tom Ferrier also returned to the series with Motorbase in the final round, driving an ex-works SEAT Toledo.

Synchro Motorsport ran James Kaye in their Honda Civic Type-R for a fourth straight season, while Jason Hughes also returned driving an ex-works MG ZS for his Kartworld Racing team.  Both Kartworld and the WSR team switched their MGs to bio-ethanol fuel later in the year.  Running bio-ethanol fuel for a second year were Tech-Speed Motorsport, who once again ran Fiona Leggate in their Vauxhall Astra Coupe. Leggate was replaced by ex-Vauxhall works driver Paul O'Neill for the final two rounds.

Mark Proctor switched from his Astra Coupe for his second season, his Fast-Tec Motorsport team instead running a Civic Type-R.  BMW and Alfa Romeo were represented on the BTCC grid for the first time since 2004, with club racers Martin Bell (Geoff Steel Racing) and Mark Smith (In-Front Motorsport) making their debuts in ex-WTCC BMW 320i's and Alfa Romeo 156s respectively.

The championship welcomed several more entries across the course of the season.  Xero Competition entered a Lexus IS200 (converted to Super 2000 rules from the Dutch touring car series) for British GT racer Adam Jones, Quest Racing ran young Irishman Eoin Murray in the ex-works Alfa Romeo 156 he won for taking the Alfa Romeo 147 Challenge title in 2005, while Richard Marsh returned to the field racing an ex-Vic Lee Racing Peugeot 307 for Team Griffin Racing.

The final two rounds saw another raft of new entries, all of which were planning full campaigns in 2007.  The pair of Lexus IS200s run by SpeedEquipe in 2005 were entered by BTC Racing for Chris Stockton and Darren Dowling, while a third Lexus was fielded by Team Forward Racing (a satellite squad of Xero Competition) for Mark Jones.  Daniels Motorsport made a second late-season appearance with their Astra Coupe, with Nick Leason at the wheel.

Other changes
 In 2006, the number of grid places to be reversed for race three’s starting grid will vary between six and ten. The actual number will be unknown at each race meeting until it is randomly drawn by the winner of race two, immediately after that race.  This was introduced to replace the previous season's rule of reversing the top ten finishers to set the grid for race three, as this had seen drivers deliberately trying to drop to tenth place in race two in order to secure pole for race three.
 The base-weight of BTC-spec cars will increase to 1175 kg (although the difference in base weight between BTC and S2000-spec cars will be the same as existed at the end of 2005)
 Cars of those who enter the BTCC late, or dip in and out of the championship, will be penalised with a maximum success ballast at their first meeting or on their return. The ballast amount will subsequently reduce in the second and third meeting in which that car competes.

Teams and drivers

Season Calendar
All races were held in the United Kingdom (excepting Mondello Park round that held in Ireland).

Championship standings

Drivers' Championship

Note: bold signifies pole position (1 point given in first race only, and race 2 and 3 poles are based on race results), italics signifies fastest lap (1 point given all races) and * signifies at least one lap in the lead (1 point given all races).

Manufacturers Championship

Teams Championship

Independents Trophy

Independent Teams Championship

External links

2006 Season
Touring Car Championship